James Earl Roberson (born May 3, 1971 in Bartow, Florida) is a former professional American football player who played defensive end for four seasons for the Houston/Tennessee Oilers and the Jacksonville Jaguars. Originally undrafted, Roberson was a starting defensive end/outside linebacker for Florida State University's 1993 NCAA National Championship football team. 

1971 births
Living people
Sportspeople from Bartow, Florida
Players of American football from Florida
American football defensive ends
Florida State Seminoles football players
Houston Oilers players
Tennessee Oilers players
Jacksonville Jaguars players
Rhein Fire players
Orlando Rage players